The General Course at LSE (the London School of Economics and Political Science) has been in operation since 1910 and is a full 'Study Year Abroad'. Today, the General Course offers a fully integrated year of undergraduate study to around 300 students of more than 40 nationalities drawn from over 130 universities. It is considered one of the most prestigious and competitive study abroad programs in the world and there are no exchange agreements with any institution and each applicant is judged solely on their own merits. Successful applicants demonstrate excellence in the social sciences and are usually within the top 10% of the class at their home institution. Notable alumni of the General Course include David Rockefeller, U.S Supreme Court Justice Anthony Kennedy and U.S. President John F. Kennedy.

Students must have completed at least two years of university level study prior to joining LSE, and enroll in mid to upper level courses alongside 2nd and 3rd year undergraduates and some graduate students. LSE Undergraduate programs are normally 3 years in duration, as full-time students must declare a course of study upon entry from secondary school.  While most General Course students attend during their second to last year of undergraduate study, some choose to attend in their final year of undergraduate study. Each year, applications are considered from January until 31 July or when slots are filled. All students on the General Course are guaranteed a place in university accommodation and have access to a calendar of subsidized social activities to explore London and Europe for a world-class study abroad experience.

London School of Economics
1910 introductions